The following are the national records in athletics in Guatemala maintained by its national athletics federation: Federación Nacional de Atletismo de Guatemala (FNA).

Outdoor

Key to tables:

h = hand timing

A = affected by altitude

NWI = no wind information

Men

Women

Indoor

Men

Women

Notes

References
General
Guatemalan Outdoor Records 11 July 2022 updated
World Athletics Statistic Handbook 2022: National Indoor Records
Specific

External links
FNA web site

Guatemala
Records
Athletics
Athletics